A thrall was a slave or serf in Scandinavian lands during the Viking Age. The status of slave contrasts with that of the freeman and the nobleman.

Etymology

Thrall is from the Old Norse , meaning a person who is in bondage or serfdom.
The term is from a Common Germanic  ("runner", from a root  "to run"). Old High German had a cognate, meaning "servant, runner".
The English derivation thraldom is of High Medieval date. The verb "to enthrall" is of Early Modern origin (metaphorical use from the 1570s, literal use from 1610).

A related Old English term is  "labourer, hireling"  (from Germanic , cognate with Gothic  "hireling", a derivation  from  "reward", from the same root as English earn).

Early Germanic law
The division is of importance in the Germanic law codes, which make special provisions for slaves, who were property and could be bought and sold, but they also enjoyed some degree of protection under the law.

The death of a freeman was compensated by a weregild, usually calculated at 200 solidi (shillings) for a freeman, whereas the death of a slave was treated as loss of property to his owner and compensated depending on the value of the worker.

Society
Thralls were the lowest class of workers in Scandinavian society. They were Europeans who were enslaved by being prisoners of war, incurring debt or being born into the class via their parents. The living conditions of thralls in Scandinavia varied depending on the master. The thrall trade as the prize of plunder was a key part of the Viking economy. While there are some estimates of as many as thirty slaves per household, most families owned only one or two slaves.

In 1043, Hallvard Vebjørnsson, the son of a local nobleman in the district of greater Lier, was killed while he was trying to defend a thrall woman from men who accused her of theft. The Church strongly approved of his action, recognised him as a martyr and canonized him as Saint Hallvard, the patron saint of Oslo.

Despite the existence of a caste system, thralls could experience a level of social fluidity. They could be freed by their masters at any time, be freed in a will or even buy their own freedom. Once a thrall was freed, he became a "freedman", or leysingi, a member of an intermediary group between slaves and freemen. He still owed allegiance to his former master and had to vote according to his former master's wishes. It took at least two generations for freedmen to lose the allegiance to their former masters and become full freemen. If a freedman had no descendants, his former master inherited his land and property.

While thralls and freedmen did not have much economic or political power in Scandinavia, they were still given a wergeld, or a man's price: there was a monetary penalty for unlawfully killing a slave.

The era of Viking raids resulting in the capture of slaves slowly ended in the 11th century. In the following centuries, more thralls obtained their freedom, either by purchasing it or on the initiative of their masters, the Church or the secular authority. The thrall system was finally abolished in Scandinavia in the mid-14th century.

See also
 Turkish Abductions - the Turkish Abductions were a series of slave raids by pirates from Northwest Africa that took place in Iceland.
Estates of the realm in Christendom in the Middle Ages
Slavery and serfdom in Norse Rus' from 10th century

Further reading

 Ben Raffield (2019) "The slave markets of the Viking world: comparative perspectives on an ‘invisible archaeology’." Slavery & Abolition, 40:4, 682-705
 Thomas K. Heebøll-Holm (2020) "Piratical slave-raiding – the demise of a Viking practice in high medieval Denmark" Scandinavian Journal of History

References

Early Germanic economy
Early Germanic law
Medieval law
Slavery in Europe
Slavery in Denmark
Slavery in Norway
Slavery in Sweden
Norse culture